Coventry North was a parliamentary constituency in the city of Coventry in the West Midlands.  It returned one Member of Parliament (MP) to the House of Commons of the Parliament of the United Kingdom, elected by the first past the post system.

History 

The constituency was created for the 1950 general election, and abolished for the February 1974 general election.

Throughout its history this constituency provided a reasonably safe seat for Labour backbencher, Maurice Edelman. His majority ranged between 1,241 (2.8%) in the 1959 election to 11,117 (22.2%) in 1950.

Boundaries 
The County Borough of Coventry wards of Bablake, Foleshill, Holbrook, Radford, and Sherbourne.

The constituency was one of three divisions of Coventry, a parliamentary borough in the historic county of Warwickshire in the West Midlands region of England.

When Coventry was first divided for parliamentary purposes, in the 1945-50 Parliament, the area that later became this constituency was split between the then two seats of Coventry East and Coventry West.

In 1974 Coventry was split into four new constituencies, and this seat disappeared. Foleshill ward became part of Coventry North East, while the remaining four wards from this seat formed the whole of Coventry North West.

Members of Parliament

Elections

Elections in the 1950s

Elections in the 1960s

Elections in the 1970s

References 

 Boundaries of Parliamentary Constituencies 1885-1972, compiled and edited by F.W.S. Craig (Parliamentary Reference Publications 1972)
 British Parliamentary Election Results 1950-1973, compiled and edited by F.W.S. Craig (Parliamentary Research Services 1983)
 Who's Who of British Members of Parliament, Volume IV 1945-1979, edited by M. Stenton and S. Lees (Harvester Press 1981)

Parliamentary constituencies in Coventry
Parliamentary constituencies in the West Midlands (county) (historic)
Parliamentary constituencies in Warwickshire (historic)
Constituencies of the Parliament of the United Kingdom established in 1950
Constituencies of the Parliament of the United Kingdom disestablished in 1974